Eodorcadion sifanicum is a species of beetle in the family Cerambycidae. It was described by Suvorov in 1912.

References

Dorcadiini
Beetles described in 1912